The Golden Rabbit is a 1962 British comedy film directed by David MacDonald and starring Timothy Bateson, Maureen Beck and Willoughby Goddard.

Plot
A bank clerk attempts to become wealthy by manufacturing gold.

Cast
 Timothy Bateson - Henry Tucker
 Maureen Beck - Sally
 Willoughby Goddard - Clitheroe
 Dick Bentley - Inspector Jackson
 John Sharp - Peebles
 Kenneth Fortescue -  Wilson
 Raymond Rollett - Manager

References

External links

1962 films
1962 comedy films
Films directed by David MacDonald (director)
British comedy films
1960s English-language films
1960s British films